Matlalatzin was a Queen of Tenochtitlan as a wife of the king Chimalpopoca, and was a princess by birth. She was a daughter of Quaquapitzahuac, king of Tlatelolco, and sister of the king Tlacateotl and queen Huacaltzintli. She bore seven children.

She and her husband were cousins.

See also
Tezozomoc (son of Chimalpopoca)
Huacaltzintli

Notes

Tenochca nobility
15th-century indigenous people of the Americas
Queens of Tenochtitlan
Nobility of the Americas